Christine Scipio-O'Dean (born 1971) is a politician from Saint Helena, who was a supporter of the approval of same-sex marriage in Saint Helena.

Career 
Scipio-O'Dean was first elected councillor in 2012, as a result of a by-election after the resignation of Tara Thomas, and became one of two women councillors alongside Bernice Olsson. Prior to her political career she worked as a teacher and in finance administration. She was re-elected in 2013, and was appointed Executive Councillor for Education. In 2014 she attended the 60th Commonwealth Parliamentary Conference, held in Cameroon.

In 2017 she was re-elected to the Legislative Council and was appointed as Chair of the Education Committee and Member of the Economic Development Committee. That year she supported the approval of same-sex marriage in Saint Helena. In 2019 she attended the 6th British Islands and Mediterranean Region (BIMR) Commonwealth Women Parliamentarians (CWP) Conference in Jersey. In 2020 she attended the British Islands and Mediterranean Region Commonwealth Women Parliamentarians Conference, hosted by the Falkland Islands Legislative Assembly.

In 2021, Scipio-O'Dean was re-elected to the Legislative Council.

References

External links 

 St Helena 2021 General Election – Candidate Interviews - Jeffrey Ellick & Christine Scipio

1971 births
Members of the Legislative Council of Saint Helena
Saint Helenian politicians
Saint Helenian women in politics
20th-century British women politicians
Saint Helena, Ascension and Tristan da Cunha people
21st-century British women politicians
Living people